Crease is a surname. Notable people with the surname include:

Henry Pering Pellew Crease (1823–1905), British lawyer, judge, and politician
Jimmy Crease (born 1949), former association football player
Kevin Crease (1936–2007), South Australian television presenter and newsreader
Robert P. Crease (born 1953), American philosopher and historian of science
Susan Reynolds Crease (1855–1947), English-born Canadian artist and activist for women's rights.
Sarah Lindley Crease (1826–1922), Canadian artist.
Josephine Crease (1864–1947), Canadian artist.